William D’Souza, S.J is the Archbishop Emeritus of Roman Catholic Archdiocese of Patna, India.

Early life 
He was born in Madanthyar in Mangalore, Karnataka on 5 March 1946.

Priesthood 
He was ordained a Catholic Missionary Priest for the Society of Jesus on 3 May 1976.

Episcopate 
He was appointed Bishop of Buxar on 12 December 2005 and ordained a bishop on 25 March 2006. He was appointed Archbishop of Patna on 1 October 2007. On 9 December 2020 D’Souza's resignation was accepted by Pope Francis, and auxiliary bishop Sebastian Kallupura was named as his successor.

References

External links

Christian clergy from Mangalore
21st-century Roman Catholic archbishops in India
1946 births
Living people
20th-century Indian Jesuits
Jesuit archbishops
People from Dakshina Kannada district
21st-century Indian Jesuits